The 2009 Købstædernes ATP Challenger was a professional tennis tournament played on indoor hard courts. It was the fifth edition of the tournament which was part of the 2009 ATP Challenger Tour. It took place in Kolding, Denmark between 12 and 18 October 2009.

ATP entrants

Seeds

 Rankings are as of October 5, 2009.

Other entrants
The following players received wildcards into the singles main draw:
  Thomas Kromann
  Frederik Nielsen
  Martin Pedersen
  Søren Wedege

The following players received entry from the qualifying draw:
  Michael Kohlmann
  Lars Pörschke
  Filip Prpic
  Dmitri Sitak

Champions

Singles

 Alex Bogdanovic def.  Ivan Dodig, 3–6, 7–6(7), defaulted

Doubles

 Martin Fischer /  Philipp Oswald def.  Jonathan Marray /  Aisam-ul-Haq Qureshi, 7–5, 6–3

References

External links
Official website
ITF Search 
2009 Draws

Kobstaedernes ATP Challenger
Tennis tournaments in Denmark
2009 in Danish tennis